Terrington railway station is a former station in Terrington St Clement, Norfolk. It opened in 1866 and was closed in 1959. It was on the Midland and Great Northern Joint Railway between the Midlands and Melton Constable.

References

Disused railway stations in Norfolk
Former Midland and Great Northern Joint Railway stations
Railway stations in Great Britain opened in 1866
Railway stations in Great Britain closed in 1959
1866 establishments in England
Terrington St Clement